U of I may refer to:

in Austria
 University of Innsbruck

in Indonesia
 University of Indonesia

in Nigeria
 University of Ibadan

in the United States of America
 University of Idaho
 University of Illinois Urbana–Champaign
 University of Indianapolis
 University of Iowa

See also
 UI (disambiguation)